Horse Creek is a stream in Solano County, California which discharges into Ulatis Creek.

Floodplain
The U.S. government has designated a portion of Horse Creek within the 100-year floodplain.

References

See also
List of rivers in California

Rivers of Solano County, California
Rivers of Northern California